Hannafordia  is a genus of flowering plants native to Australia

Species include:

Hannafordia bissillii F.Muell. – Grey Felt-bush  or Tjirin-tjirinpa (Ngaanyatjarra language) 
Hannafordia quadrivalvis F.Muell. 
Hannafordia shanesii F.Muell.

References

Malvales of Australia
Byttnerioideae
Malvaceae genera